Datu Puti is a condiment brand owned by NutriAsia, Inc. (formerly known as Southeast Asia Food, Inc.). Datu Puti was first introduced as a vinegar product in 1975 by Hernan Reyes. Eventually, soy sauce and fish sauce under the Datu Puti brand were introduced in the 1990s. An oyster sauce product was also introduced.

Branding 
Datu Puti is a combination of the surname of Reyes' mother (Dátu), and the Filipino translation of the color white ("puti"), which is a primary color of the traditional palm or sukang paombong. The logo used for the brand features the image of a datu.

The campaign was launched in the early 1980s which featured the comedian Conrado "Pugak" Piring, making a facial expression of having consumed something sour, dubbed as the "mukhasim" face.

Products
Datu Puti White Vinegar
Datu Puti Original
Datu Puti Sukang Iloko
Datu Puti Sukang Sinamak
Datu Puti Pinoy Spice
Datu Puti Soy Sauce
Datu Puti Toyomixes
Datu Puti Toyomansi
Datu Puti Toyochili
Datu Puti Toyomagic
Datu Puti Fish Sauce
Datu Puti Natural Selections:
Natural Cane Vinegar
Premium Soy Sauce
Brewed Soy Sauce
Thai Fish Sauce
Datu Puti Adobo Series
Classic Adobo
Spicy Adobo
Pininyahang Adobo
Adobo sa Gata
Humba
Datu Puti Oyster Sauce
Datu Puti Barbecue Marinade
Datu Puti Pares Pack (Vinegar & Soy Sauce)

Market share
In August 2011, it was reported the Datu Puti is the Philippine market leader in vinegar. In the same report, the brand also leads in Luzon when it comes to soy sauce.

References 

Philippine brands
NutriAsia brands
Philippine condiments
Brand name condiments